"Fair" is a song recorded by American singer Normani. It was released on March 18, 2022, through RCA, as the second single from her upcoming debut studio album.

Background and promotion
In December 2021, Normani appeared on The Ellen DeGeneres Show to announce that her upcoming debut studio album was "almost done." The song itself was first teased by Normani on December 31, 2021. During an Instagram livestream in February 2022, she asked her fans on how they would think the song would sound like. She herself said of the song, "this one is really unique and different for me, assuming that it is "not what everyone is expecting." She further described the track as "genre bending for sure," as well as "just a great record." The song was then used in a clip uploaded to TikTok on February 23, 2022. Another 10-second teaser was released on March 1, 2022, and shows the singer in a black bikini at the set of the accompanying music video. The single was officially announced that same day. Another teaser was posted to Instagram with the singer sitting down to paint. The singer offered more insight on the song after the announcement by saying "Vulnerability. Raw Normani. A different layer that you've never seen before." To her, the song reflects a point in her life "that was really honest" and signifies "growth" that she is able "to share with everybody else."

Normani performed "Fair" for the first time on The Tonight Show Starring Jimmy Fallon on March 18, 2022, the performance airing just thirty minutes after the song was released.

Credits and personnel
Credits adapted from Normani and manager Brandon Silverstein on Twitter.

 Normani – vocals, songwriting
 Abby Keen – songwriting, additional vocal production
 Felisha Fury – songwriting
 Harv – production
 Kuk Harrell – vocal production, vocal engineering
 Jaycen Joshua – mixing, mastering
 Rachel Blum – mixing, mastering
 Jacob Richards – mixing assistance
 Mike Seaberg – mixing assistance
 DJ Riggins – mixing assistance

Charts

Release history

References

2022 singles
2022 songs
Normani songs
RCA Records singles
Songs written by Normani
Song recordings produced by Harv